Travers Guy Rogers MC (1876–1967) was an author and priest in the Church of England who became a chaplain to King George V in 1918.

Career

He was educated at Trinity College, Dublin, where he was awarded BA in 1898 and BD in 1901. In 1899 he received the Term Composition Prize from the Divinity School.

He was ordained a deacon in 1900 and priest in 1901.

He was made a temporary chaplain to the forces on 12 October 1915 and served as Chaplain to the 2nd Guards Brigade. He described the harrowing ordeal of preparing a deserter for his execution after his trial in 1916 in letters written home to his family. He was awarded the Military Cross for conspicuous gallantry in 1916. He relinquished this commission on 1 January 1917.

He was appointed a Chaplain to the King in 1918.

He was appointed:
Vicar of St Matthias's Church, Dublin 1900–1902
Vicar of Monkstown Church, Dublin 1902–1903
Vicar of St Barnabas's Church, Kensington 1903–1906
Vicar of Holy Trinity Church, Marylebone 1906–1909
Vicar of St John the Evangelist with St Stephen's Church, Reading 1909–1915
Vicar of All Saints' Church, West Ham 1916–1924
Rector of St Martin in the Bull Ring Birmingham 1924–1948

Publications
The Inner Life. Essays in Liberal Evangelicalism (1925)
The Church and the People, Sampson Low, Marston and Co. (1931)
The return to God: an Anglican View (1933)
A Rebel at Heart: The Autobiography of a Nonconforming Churchman, Longmans Green and Co. (1956)

Notes

1876 births
1967 deaths
Alumni of Trinity College Dublin
English military chaplains
Honorary Chaplains to the Queen
Recipients of the Military Cross